Tobiesen Island is one of the Rønnbeck Islands in the Svalbard archipelago. It lies in Hinlopen Strait northeast of Cape Weyprecht on Spitsbergen. It is the northernmost and easternmost island in the archipelago.

The island is a low basalt cliff. There are some unnamed rocks and islets lying off the island to the northwest. The wildlife consists largely of polar bears.

The island was discovered in 1867 by the Swedish-Norwegian polar explorer Nils Fredrik Rønnbeck. It is named after Sivert Kristian Tobiesen (1821–1873), a Norwegian seal hunter that spent the winter on Bear Island.

References

Islands of Svalbard
Seal hunting